Tylostega is a genus of moths of the family Crambidae described by Edward Meyrick in 1894.

Species
Tylostega chrysanthes Meyrick, 1894
Tylostega lata Du & Li, 2008
Tylostega luniformis Du & Li, 2008
Tylostega mesodora Meyrick, 1894
Tylostega pectinata Du & Li, 2008
Tylostega photias Meyrick, 1894
Tylostega serrata Du & Li, 2008
Tylostega tylostegalis (Hampson, 1900)
Tylostega valvata Warren, 1896

References

 Du, X.-C. & Li., H.-H. (2008). Zootaxa 1681: 51-61.

Spilomelinae
Crambidae genera
Taxa named by Edward Meyrick